Michael Leonard (born 20 February 1974 in Knutsford) is a male field hockey defender from Scotland, who earned his first cap for the Men's National Team in 1996. He plays club hockey for Grange. Leonard has also been capped six times for the Scotland B cricket team.

References
sportscotland

1974 births
Living people
Scottish male field hockey players
Field hockey players at the 2006 Commonwealth Games
People from Knutsford
Sportspeople from Cheshire
Scottish cricketers
Commonwealth Games competitors for Scotland